Airline Allied Services Limited (AASL) is Public Sector Undertaking (PSU) of the Government of India and is a subsidiary of Air India Assets Holding limited.  Established in 1983, AASL provides air transport services under the name "Alliance Air".  AASL is headquartered in New Delhi.

References 

Companies based in New Delhi
Air India
Government-owned companies of India
Transport companies of India
Indian companies established in 1983
1983 establishments in Delhi